Sumter District Schools is a public school district that covers Sumter County, Florida. The district has its headquarters in Bushnell, Florida.

School Board

Members as of 2020-2021

Chairperson: David A. Williams

Vice Chairperson: Sally Moss
District 1 - Sally Moss
District 2 - Brett Sherman
District 3 - David A. Williams
District 4 - Russell Hogan
District 5 - Kathie L. Joiner

Schools

High schools
South Sumter High School ("Raiders")
Wildwood Middle High School ("Wildcats")

Middle schools
South Sumter Middle School
Wildwood Middle High School

Elementary schools
Bushnell Elementary School
Lake Panasoffkee Elementary School
Webster Elementary School
Wildwood Elementary School

Charter schools
The Villages Charter Schools

Specialty schools 

 Sumter P.R.E.P. Academy

References

External links
 Official website of Sumter District Schools

Education in Sumter County, Florida
School districts in Florida